Condron is an English surname.

Notable people with this surname include:
 Andrew Condron, Scottish Korean War defector
 Enda Condron, Irish Gaelic football player
 Jim Condron, American artist
 John Condron, Irish businessman
 Kelly Condron, English actress
 Michael Condron, Canadian actor

Condron is supposedly known as an Irish surname, but there are some Condron Family roots all across America and Canada.